Rear Admiral George Henry Wadleigh (September 28, 1842 – July 11, 1927) served in the United States Navy during the American Civil War and the Spanish–American War.

Biography
Wadleigh was born in Dover, New Hampshire, and entered the United States Naval Academy on September 26, 1860, with the rank of midshipman. He graduated on May 28, 1863, with the rank of ensign.

After the Civil War he became a companion of the Massachusetts Commandery of the Military Order of the Loyal Legion of the United States.

During the following decade he had shore duty at the Naval Academy and several other facilities and was executive officer of the gunboat , monitor , schoolship  and sloop .

Promoted to commander on March 13, 1880, in 1881 he commanded  during an arduous Arctic cruise searching for survivors of the ill-fated Jeannette expedition.

Commander Wadleigh spend most of the 1880s in shore positions. He returned to duty afloat in 1889–1891 as Commanding Officer of the Great Lakes gunboat . Promoted to captain on July 10, 1894, he commanded the receiving ship  until late in that year, then took command of the new cruiser , in which he cruised in U.S., West Indian and European waters into 1897.

Captain Wadleigh served at the Boston Navy Yard until June 1898, including some very busy months near the end of that tour as the Navy prepared ships for Spanish–American War operations. From July 1898 until December 1901 he was Commanding Officer of the cruiser , in the Pacific, and the receiving ship  at Boston.

He achieved the rank of rear admiral in February 1902 and was briefly Commandant of the Philadelphia Navy Yard and President of the Board of Inspection and Survey before retiring from active duty in June of that year. In retirement, Rear Admiral Wadleigh made his home at Dover, New Hampshire. He died on July 11, 1927.

Namesake
The destroyer  was named in honor of Rear Admiral Wadleigh.

Gallery

References

 

1842 births
1927 deaths
Union Navy officers
American military personnel of the Spanish–American War
United States Navy admirals
People of New Hampshire in the American Civil War
People from Dover, New Hampshire